Tesh may refer to:
 The symbol  used for the voiceless postalveolar affricate in the International Phonetic Alphabet
 John Tesh (born 1952), American pianist, pop music composer, radio host and television presenter
 Tesh, Tjesh or Thesh, Predynastic ancient Egyptian king
Tesh, Iran, a village in Gilan Province, Iran